The Solarpark Heideblick is a photovoltaic power station in Heideblick, Germany. It has a capacity of 27.5 megawatts (MW). The solar park was developed and built by Enerparc.

The PV project is built on a former military training field, using ReneSola modules.

See also

List of photovoltaic power stations
PV system
List of photovoltaic power stations
Solar power in Germany
Electricity sector in Germany

References

Heideblick